Ernest Gerard "Ernie" Wright, (10 July 1901 – 16 January 1981) was an Australian politician. He was a member of the New South Wales Legislative Council for the Australian Labor Party (New South Wales Branch) for 29 years from 1943 to 1973 and also served as Chairman of Committees from 1953 to 1967. He also served as an Alderman on Newtown Municipal Council from 1944 to 1948, including from July to December as Mayor, being the last holder of that office before the council's amalgamation with the City of Sydney.

References

External links
Ernest Gerard Wright – Sydney's Aldermen
 

1901 births
1981 deaths
Mayors of Newtown
Members of the New South Wales Legislative Council
Australian Labor Party members of the Parliament of New South Wales
20th-century Australian politicians
Chairman of Committees of the New South Wales Legislative Council